Chubaytal (Sıbaytal) is a rural locality (a village) in Sultanmuratovsky Selsoviet, Aurgazinsky District, Bashkortostan, Russia. The population was 75 as of 2010. There is 1 street.

Geography 
Chubaytal is located 12 km northwest of Tolbazy (the district's administrative centre) by road. Alexeyevka is the nearest rural locality.

References 

Rural localities in Aurgazinsky District